Muslims (Serbo-Croatian Latin and , Serbo-Croatian Cyrillic and ) is a designation for the ethnoreligious group of Serbo-Croatian-speaking Muslims and people of Muslim heritage, inhabiting mostly the territory of the former Socialist Federal Republic of Yugoslavia. The term, adopted in the 1971 Constitution of Yugoslavia, groups together a number of distinct South Slavic communities of Islamic ethnocultural tradition. Prior to 1993, a vast majority of present-day Bosniaks self-identified as ethnic Muslims, along with some smaller groups of different ethnicity, such as Gorani and Torbeši. This designation did not include Yugoslav non-Slavic Muslims, such as Albanians, Turks and Roma.
 	
After the breakup of Yugoslavia, a majority of the Slavic Muslims of Bosnia and Herzegovina adopted the Bosniak ethnic designation, and they are today constitutionally recognized as one of three constituent peoples of Bosnia and Herzegovina. Approximately 100,000 people across the rest of the former Yugoslavia consider themselves to be Slavic Muslims, mostly in Serbia. They are constitutionally recognized as a distinct ethnic minority in Montenegro.

Background 

The Ottoman conquests led to many autochthonous inhabitants converting to Islam. Although nationalist ideologies appeared among South Slavs as early as the 19th century, as with the First and Second Serbian Uprising and the Illyrian movement, national identification was a foreign concept to the general population, which primarily identified itself by denomination and province. The emergence of modern nation-states forced the ethnically and religiously diverse Ottoman Empire to modernise, which resulted in the adoption of several reforms. The most significant of these were the Edict of Gülhane of 1839 and Imperial Reform Edict of 1856. These gave non-Muslim subjects of the Empire equal status and strengthen their autonomous Millet communities.

There was a strong rivalry between South Slavic nationalisms. Vuk Karadžić, then the leading representative of Serbian nationalism, considered all speakers of the Štokavian dialect, regardless of religious affiliation, to be Serbs. Josip Juraj Strossmayer, the Croatian Catholic bishop and his People's Party advocated the idea of South Slavic unity, while Ante Starčević and his Party of Rights sought to restore the Croatian state on the basis of the so-called historical right, considering Bosnian Muslims as Croats. In both Croatian and Serbian national ideology, the territory of the Bosnia vilayet was of great importance because both wanted to incorporate it into their future national states. From their point of view, Bosnian Muslims were Croats or Serbs who converted to Islam. In 1870, Bosnian Muslims made up 42.5 percent of the population of the Bosnia vilayet, while Orthodox were 41.7 and Catholics 14.5 percent. Which national state would get the territory of the Bosnia vilayet thus depended on who the Bosnian Muslims would favour, the Croats or the Serbs.

In Bosnia and Herzegovina at that time, the population did not identify with national categories, except for a few intellectuals from urban areas who claimed to be Croats or Serbs. The population of Bosnia and Herzegovina primarily identified itself by religion, using the terms Turk (for Muslims), Hrišćani (Christians) or Greeks (for the Orthodox) and "Kršćani" or Latins (for the Catholics). Furthermore, the Bosna vilayet particularly resisted the reforms, which culminated with the rebellion of Husein Gradaščević and his ayans in 1831. Reforms were introduced in Bosnia and Herzegovina only after Omer Pasha Latas forcibly returned the province to the sultan's authority in 1850. The reforms marked the loss of the influence of the ulama (the educated clergy), Sharia was no longer used outside of family matters, and a system of public education was introduced, in addition to religious education. The reforms marked the beginning of journalism and the establishment of modern political institutions, and ultimately the establishment of a provincial assembly in 1865, in which non-Muslims also sat.

The revolt of the Bosnian ayans and the attempted formulation of provincial identity in the 1860s are often portrayed as the first signs of a Bosnian national identity. However, Bosnian national identity beyond confessional borders was rare, and the strong Bosnian identity of individual ayans or Franciscans expressed at that time was a reflection of regional affiliation, with a strong religious aspect. Christians identified more with the Croatian or Serbian nation. For Muslims, identity was more related to the defence of local privileges, but it did not call into question the allegiance to the Ottoman Empire. The use of the term "Bosniak" at that time did not have a national meaning, but a regional one. When Austria-Hungary occupied Bosnia and Herzegovina in 1878, national identification was still a foreign concept to Bosnian Muslims.

History
After World War II, in the Socialist Federal Republic of Yugoslavia, the Bosnian Muslims continued to be treated as a religious group instead of an ethnic one. Aleksandar Ranković and other Serb communist members opposed the recognition of Bosniak nationality. Muslim members of the communist party continued in their efforts to get Tito to support their position for recognition. Nevertheless, in a debate that went on during the 1960s, many Bosnian Muslim communist intellectuals argued that the Muslims of Bosnia and Herzegovina are in fact a distinct native Slavic people that should be recognized as a nation. In 1964, the Fourth Congress of the Bosnian branch of the League of Communists of Yugoslavia assured their Bosnian Muslim membership the Bosnian Muslims' right to self-determination will be fulfilled, thus prompting the recognition of Bosnian Muslims as a distinct nation at a meeting of the Bosnian Central Committee in 1968, however not under the Bosniak or Bosnian name, as opted by the Bosnian Muslim communist leadership. As a compromise, the Constitution of Yugoslavia was amended to list "Muslims" in a national sense; recognizing a constitutive nation, but not the Bosniak name. The use of Muslim as an ethnic denomination was criticized early on, especially on account of motives and reasoning, as well as disregard of this aspect of Bosnian nationhood. Following the downfall of Ranković, Tito had also changed his view and stated that recognition of Muslims and their national identity should occur. In 1968 the move was protested in the Serbia and by Serb nationalists such as Dobrica Ćosić. The change was opposed by the Macedonian branch of the Yugoslav Communist Party. They viewed Macedonian speaking Muslims as Macedonians and were concerned that statewide recognition of Muslims as a distinct nation could threaten the demographic balance of the Macedonian republic.

Sometimes other terms, such as Muslim with capital M were used, that is, "musliman" was a practicing Muslim while "Musliman" was a member of this nation (Serbo-Croatian uses capital letters for names of peoples but small for names of adherents).

The election law of Bosnia and Herzegovina as well as the Constitution of Bosnia and Herzegovina, recognizes the results from 1991 population census as results referring to Bosniaks.

Population

 In Serbia, according to the 2011 census there were 22,301 Muslims by nationality, 145,278 Bosniaks as well as few Serb Muslims (ethnic Serbs who are Muslims (adherents of Islam) by their religious affiliation).
 In Montenegro census of 2011, 20,537 (3.3%) of the population declared as Muslims by nationality; while 53,605 (8.6%) declared as Bosniaks; while 175 (0.03%) Muslims by confession declared as Montenegrin Muslims. Muslims and Bosniaks are considered as a two separate ethnic groups, and both of them have their own separate National Councils. Also to mention, many Muslims consider themselves as Montenegrins of Islamic faith. National Council of Muslims of Montenegro insists their mother tongue is Montenegrin.
 In 2002 Slovenia census, 21,542 persons identified as Bosniaks (thereof 19,923 Bosniak Muslims); 8,062 as Bosnians (thereof 5,724 Bosnian Muslims), 2,804 were Slovenian Muslims. while 9,328 chose Muslims by nationality.
 In North Macedonia, the census of 2021 registered 16,042 (0,87%) Bosniaks and 1,187 (0.13%) Muslims by ethnicity. There are also 455 identified as Macedonian Muslims, separate of the 4,178 Torbeši, a minority religious group within the community of ethnic Macedonians who are Muslims by religious affiliation. It is also important to note that most Torbeši were declared as Muslims by nationality prior to 1990.
 In Croatia, according to the census of 2011 there were 6,704 Muslims by nationality, 27,959 Bosniak Muslims, 9,594 Albanian Muslims, 9,647 Croat Muslims and 5,039 Muslim Roma. The Bosniaks of Croatia are the largest minority practicing Islam in Croatia.

See also

 Bosniaks
 Gorani people
 Serb Muslims
 Croat Muslims
 Macedonian Muslims
 Bulgarian Muslims 
 Pomaks
 Cultural Muslims

Footnotes

References

Further reading

External links 

 Central Organization of Muslims in Montenegro (official pages)
 Council of Muslims in Montenegro (official pages)
 The Voice of Muslims in Montenegro (official pages)

Ethnoreligious groups
Slavic ethnic groups
Muslims by ethnicity
Ethnic groups in Bosnia and Herzegovina
Ethnic groups in Croatia
Ethnic groups in Kosovo
Ethnic groups in Montenegro
Ethnic groups in North Macedonia
Ethnic groups in Serbia
Ethnic groups in Slovenia
Ethnic groups in Vojvodina
Socialist Federal Republic of Yugoslavia
South Slavs
Bosniak history
Ethno-cultural designations
History of Sandžak